Tennis Week was an American sports magazine owned by media conglomerate IMG covering the world of tennis.

History
Founded in 1974 by Eugene L. Scott, a former US Davis Cup player who was ranked within the world top 15. 
In December 2004, Tennis Week and the spirit of Eugene L. Scott traveled the American tennis ideals across the Atlantic, collaborating with a Greek tennis magazine called “Tennis Insider: the Greek edition of Tennis Week USA”. Tennis Insider was published by Direction SA and John Parthenios the person who arranged the whole project with Tennis Week USA from the very first beginning was the editor-in-chief and marketing director of the Greek attempt. The historical US magazine was acquired by IMG in December 2006, seven months after Scott's death.

They were partnered with the USPTA through 2008; to be offered as part of the USPTA membership subscription.

The print magazine was discontinued in March 2009 "to focus on its online web site".

IMG removed the website December 1, 2009.

Staff
A number of famous tennis players have joined the staff over the years, such as Maria Sharapova.

See also

 Tennis (magazine)
 Inside Tennis

References

Sports magazines published in the United States
Weekly magazines published in the United States
Defunct magazines published in the United States
Magazines established in 1974
Magazines disestablished in 2009
Magazines published in New York (state)
Tennis magazines
1974 establishments in New York (state)
2009 disestablishments in New York (state)